Anathallis vasquezii is a species of orchid plant native to Bolivia.

References 

vasquezii
Flora of Bolivia